Hugo Nys (born 16 February 1991) is a French-born Monegasque tennis player who is a doubles specialist on the ATP Tour. On 29 July 2019, he reached his highest ATP singles ranking of No. 327 and he achieved his highest doubles ranking of No. 19 on 27 February 2023. He became the first ever Monegasque player to reach the semifinal and final of a Major after reaching the final of the 2023 Australian Open.

Career

2021: French Open quarterfinal, Two doubles titles, top 50
Nys won his second doubles title at the Estoril Open, partnering Tim Pütz.

Later in May, Nys won his next doubles title at the Lyon Open, again with Pütz. As a result, he reached a career-high of No. 53 in doubles on 24 May 2021.

The Nys/Pütz duo reached the quarterfinals of the 2021 French Open where they were defeated by eventual runner-ups Kazakh duo Bublik/Golubev.

2022: US Open quarterfinal, Fourth ATP title 
At the US Open he reached the quarterfinals of a Grand Slam for the second time in his career partnering Jan Zieliński defeating 10th seeded pair Jamie Murray/ Bruno Soares and Ariel Behar/Gonzalo Escobar. The pair won their first title together at the 2022 Moselle Open.

2023: Australian Open final, top 20 debut
Partnering Zieliński again, Nys reached his first Grand Slam final, defeating second seeds Rajeev Ram and Joe Salisbury on their way. They were defeated by wildcard Australian pair of Jason Kubler and Rinky Hijikata in the final.
He reached the top 20 on 13 February 2023.

Doubles performance timeline

Men's doubles

Mixed's doubles

ATP career finals

Doubles: 9 (4 titles, 5 runner-ups)

Challenger and Futures finals

Singles: 12 (6–6)

Doubles: 69 (38–31)

References

External links
 
 
 

1991 births
Living people
Monegasque male tennis players
French male tennis players
Monegasque people of French descent
Sportspeople from Haute-Savoie
People from Évian-les-Bains